Farewell Baghdad can refer to:

 Farewell Baghdad (2010 film), a 2010 Iranian film
 Farewell Baghdad (2013 film), a 2013 Israeli film